Rhyolite is a type of volcanic rock. Rhyolite may also refer to
Rhyolite, Nevada, a ghost town in the U.S.
McNulty rhyolite, a geological formation in Colorado, U.S.
Rhyolite Head, a headland in Antarctica
Rhyolite Islands in Antarctica
Aquacade (satellite) formerly known as Rhyolite